Miloud Mourad Benamara (born 28 October 1977) is an Algerian-born Italian actor.

Early life
Benamara is originally from Oran; he studied drama in Algeria before moving to Italy.

Career
In Italy, Benamara has frequently appeared in character actor roles in film and television, usually as an Arab, whether a terrorist or a businessman. He played a street sweeper in the 2015 James Bond film Spectre (2015), and plays Omar, one of three Iraqi businessmen, in the 2021 House of Gucci. In 2021 he doubled Tahar Rahim for Arabic dialog in the film The Mauritanian.

Filmography

Film

Television

Awards
In 2019 he won, in Quercianella in the province of Livorno, the award for best actor for the short film Humam by Carmelo Segreto (Premio Quercia).

References

External links

Living people
1977 births
20th-century Italian male actors
21st-century Italian male actors
21st-century Algerian male actors
Algerian expatriates in Italy